Jayrajsinh Jadeja is an Indian politician who has been twice member of the Gujarat Legislative Assembly, representing Gondal. He is a member of the Bharatiya Janata Party. In 2021, he was acquitted in court of rioting.

Early life 
Jayrajsinh was born in Gujarat and his father, Jayrajsinh Tekhubha Jadeja, was a farmer.

References 

Bharatiya Janata Party politicians from Gujarat
Gujarat politicians
Year of birth missing (living people)
Living people